Franc Žitnik (born March 8, 1941 in Ljubljana) is a Yugoslav retired slalom canoeist who competed from the late 1950s to the mid-1970s. He won a silver medal in the C-2 team event at the 1965 ICF Canoe Slalom World Championships in Spittal. Žitnik also finished 19th in the C-2 event at the 1972 Summer Olympics in Munich.

His son Boštjan represented Slovenia at the 1992 Summer Olympics where he finished 10th in the C-1 event.

References
 

1941 births
Canoeists at the 1972 Summer Olympics
Living people
Olympic canoeists of Yugoslavia
Yugoslav male canoeists
Slovenian male canoeists
Sportspeople from Ljubljana
Medalists at the ICF Canoe Slalom World Championships